Andrew John Economos (born June 24, 1982) is a former American football long snapper. He played college football at Georgia Tech and was signed as an undrafted free agent by the Jacksonville Jaguars in 2005. Economos was also a member of the Tampa Bay Buccaneers.

High school career
Economos graduated from Atlanta's Marist High School and was a letterman in football, basketball, hockey and baseball. In basketball, he led his team to the 2000 Georgia State Championship as a senior.

College career
Economos was a long snapper at Georgia Tech and named to the 2003-2004 ACC Academic Honor Roll.  At Tech, he became a member of the Phi Delta Theta fraternity.

Professional career
On April 24, 2005 signed as an undrafted free agent with the Jacksonville Jaguars after he wasn't drafted in the 2005 NFL Draft. He was released in 2006 after spending time on the practice squad.

On June 13, 2008, Economos signed a 5-year, $4 million contract to remain with the Buccaneers, who he has been a long snapper since 2006. He snapped for Tampa Bay all of 2007.

References

External links
Tampa Bay Buccaneers bio
Georgia Tech Yellow Jackets bio

1982 births
Living people
Players of American football from Atlanta
American football long snappers
Georgia Tech Yellow Jackets football players
Jacksonville Jaguars players
Tampa Bay Buccaneers players
Marist School (Georgia) alumni